Declan Nash (born 10 July 1966) is a retired Irish sportsperson.  He played hurling with his local club South Liberties and was a member of the Limerick senior inter-county team in the 1980s and 1990s.

References

1966 births
Living people
Irish builders
Limerick inter-county hurlers
Munster inter-provincial hurlers
South Liberties hurlers